Matthew 2 is the second chapter of the Gospel of Matthew in the New Testament. It describes the events after the birth of Jesus, the visit of the magi and the attempt by King Herod to kill the infant messiah, Joseph and his family's flight into Egypt, and their later return to live in Israel, settling in Nazareth.

Text
The original text was written in Koine Greek. This chapter is divided into 23 verses.

Textual witnesses
Some early manuscripts containing the text of this chapter are:
Codex Vaticanus (~325–350; complete)
Codex Sinaiticus (~330–360; complete)
Codex Washingtonianus (~400)
Codex Bezae (~400; complete)
Codex Ephraemi Rescriptus (~450; complete)

Analysis

The infancy narrative of Jesus in the Gospel of Matthew has some parallels with the story of Moses's infancy in Jewish literature and the writings of Josephus, as in the table below.

This chapter consists of four sections, each of which refers to a quotation from the Old Testament which Matthew sees Jesus fulfilling:
Micah 5:2 - And you, Bethlehem ...
Hosea 11:1 - I called my son out of Egypt
Jeremiah 31:15 - A voice was heard in Ramah, lamentation and bitter weeping, Rachel weeping for her children, refusing to be comforted for her children, because they are no more
He shall be called a Nazarene - Matthew's text states that these words were "spoken by the prophets", but "it is not clear which prophetic oracles Matthew alludes to".

The last portion of Matthew 1 is similarly written, with a quotation from Isaiah 7:14, and is often seen as part of this same section. Theologian Krister Stendahl notes that each of the four quotes in this chapter contain place names, and sees this entire chapter as apologetics for why the messiah moved from the important centre of Bethlehem to the minor one of Nazareth.

R.T. France notes that the Old Testament quotations in this chapter are "notoriously obscure and unconvincing". Many of them are heavily modified from the originals, with some passages being reversed in meaning. Almost all of them are taken out of context, and presented as prophecy when they were not in the original. The most confusing is that cited in Matthew 2:23, which does not appear anywhere in the Old Testament. Jerome associates it with Isaiah 11:1, where the etymology of Nazareth is derived from the Hebrew word for branch (ne'tser). That the quotations have been so contorted to fit the narrative, is to France and others, clear evidence that the narrative came first, and the quotations were added after. The author of Matthew firmly believed in the accuracy of the narrative he was recording, and would not alter it to make it better fit the prophecies.

As with Matthew 1 most scholars see this chapter as geared towards proving that Jesus is the messiah who was foretold by the prophets. The chapter contains five references to the Old Testament, a greater density than anywhere else in the New Testament. The author of Matthew uses them to try and demonstrate that Jesus matches the predictions of the prophets. Schweizer sees the chapter as being divided into five subsections, each ending with an Old Testament quotation. As with the genealogy of Matthew 1 many scholars feel that this chapter is trying to portray Jesus as the culmination of Jewish history with the author of Matthew relating events in Jesus' life to important ones in history. The author of Matthew is paralleling Exodus in this chapter with Jesus as Moses and Herod as Pharaoh. The Gospel also takes care to mention a sojourn by the Holy Family in Egypt that is mentioned nowhere else. Through a quote from Jeremiah (31:15), the Massacre of the Innocents is linked to the Babylonian Captivity, and Jesus being born in Bethlehem echoes King David who was also born in that village.

J. D. Kingsbury also sees this chapter as an exercise in apologetics with the cooperation of the chief priests and scribes with Herod, as described in Matthew 2:3 and Matthew 2:4, as prefiguring how the Jews and Gentiles will later respond to Christianity. American theologian Robert H. Gundry notes that persecution is an important theme of Matthew, who was writing at a time when a number of forces were working to crush the new religious movement. Paul L. Maier and R.T. France reject this however, France writing "What Christian writer of exemplary fiction would willingly chose Herod the Idumaean, of all unlikely candidates, to represent Israel, and a group of innocent children murdered in Bethlehem to stand for Israel's punishment." 

Most of what is in this chapter is found in no other gospel and differs sharply from the infancy narrative in Luke 2. Conservative scholars have developed theories to explain these discrepancies which allow them to stand by the inerrancy of the Bible. Other scholars feel that this part of the Gospel of Matthew is not a literal work of history: for example, Gundry sees Matthew's gospel as a heavily embellished version of Luke's, with the humble shepherds transformed into the more exotic magi.

Verses

Full text
In the King James Version this chapter reads:

 Now when Jesus was born in Bethlehem of Judaea in the days of Herod the king, behold, there came wise men from the east to Jerusalem,
Saying, Where is he that is born King of the Jews? for we have seen his star in the east, and are come to worship him.
When Herod the king had heard these things, he was troubled, and all Jerusalem with him.
And when he had gathered all the chief priests and scribes of the people together, he demanded of them where Christ should be born.
And they said unto him, In Bethlehem of Judaea: for thus it is written by the prophet,
And thou Bethlehem, in the land of Juda, art not the least among the princes of Juda: for out of thee shall come a Governor, that shall rule my people Israel.
Then Herod, when he had privily called the wise men, enquired of them diligently what time the star appeared.
And he sent them to Bethlehem, and said, Go and search diligently for the young child; and when ye have found him, bring me word again, that I may come and worship him also.
When they had heard the king, they departed; and, lo, the star, which they saw in the east, went before them, till it came and stood over where the young child was.
When they saw the star, they rejoiced with exceeding great joy.
And when they were come into the house, they saw the young child with Mary his mother, and fell down, and worshipped him: and when they had opened their treasures, they presented unto him gifts; gold, and frankincense and myrrh.
And being warned of God in a dream that they should not return to Herod, they departed into their own country another way.
And when they were departed, behold, the angel of the Lord appeareth to Joseph in a dream, saying, Arise, and take the young child and his mother, and flee into Egypt, and be thou there until I bring thee word: for Herod will seek the young child to destroy him.
When he arose, he took the young child and his mother by night, and departed into Egypt:
And was there until the death of Herod: that it might be fulfilled which was spoken of the Lord by the prophet, saying, Out of Egypt have I called my son.
Then Herod, when he saw that he was mocked of the wise men, was exceeding wroth, and sent forth, and slew all the children that were in Bethlehem, and in all the coasts thereof, from two years old and under, according to the time which he had diligently inquired of the wise men.
Then was fulfilled that which was spoken by Jeremy the prophet, saying,
In Rama was there a voice heard, lamentation, and weeping, and great mourning, Rachel weeping for her children, and would not be comforted, because they are not.
But when Herod was dead, behold, an angel of the Lord appeareth in a dream to Joseph in Egypt,
Saying, Arise, and take the young child and his mother, and go into the land of Israel: for they are dead which sought the young child's life.
And he arose, and took the young child and his mother, and came into the land of Israel.
But when he heard that Archelaus did reign in Judaea in the room of his father Herod, he was afraid to go thither: notwithstanding, being warned of God in a dream, he turned aside into the parts of Galilee:
And he came and dwelt in a city called Nazareth: that it might be fulfilled which was spoken by the prophets, He shall be called a Nazarene.

See also
Star of Bethlehem

Notes

References

Citations

Sources 

 Albright, W.F. and C.S. Mann. "Matthew." The Anchor Bible Series. New York: Doubleday & Company, 1971.

 Brown, Raymond E. The Birth of the Messiah: A Commentary on the Infancy Narratives in Matthew and Luke. London: G. Chapman, 1977.
 Carter, Warren. Matthew and Empire. Harrisburg: Trinity Press International, 2001.
 Clarke, Howard W. The Gospel of Matthew and its Readers: A Historical Introduction to the First Gospel. Bloomington: Indiana University Press, 2003.
 France, R.T. "The Formula Quotations of Matthew 2 and the Problem of Communications." New Testament Studies. Vol. 27, 1981.
 Hill, David. The Gospel of Matthew. Grand Rapids: Eerdmans, 1981
 Levine, Amy-Jill. "Matthew." Women's Bible Commentary. Carol A. Newsom and Sharon H. Ringe, eds. Louisville: Westminster John Knox Press, 1998.

External links 
 
 King James Bible - Wikisource
English Translation with Parallel Latin Vulgate
Online Bible at GospelHall.org (ESV, KJV, Darby, American Standard Version, Bible in Basic English)
Multiple bible versions at Bible Gateway (NKJV, NIV, NRSV etc.)

 
Matthew 02
Biblical Magi in the New Testament
Star of Bethlehem